My Pick of the Hits is an album by American country singer Ernest Tubb, released in 1965 (see 1965 in music). It reached number 15 on the Billboard Country Albums chart.

Track listing 
 "Big City" (Paul Williams, Sam Humphrey)
 "Wild Side of Life" (William Warren, Arlie A. Carter)
 "I Wonder Where You Are Tonight" (Johnny Bond)
 "Beggar to a King" (J. P. Richardson)
 "Before I'm Over You" (Betty Sue Perry)
 "Each Night at Nine" (Floyd Tillman)
 "Fraulein" (Lawton Williams)
 "When Two Worlds Collide" (Roger Miller, Bill Anderson)
 "I've Got a Tiger By the Tail" (Harlan Howard, Buck Owens)
 "She Called Me Baby" (Harlan Howard)
 "Tell Her So" (Glen D. Tubb)
 "Don't Be Angry" (Wade Jackson)

Personnel 
 Ernest Tubb – vocals, guitar
 Cal Smith – guitar
 Leon Rhodes – guitar
 Grady Martin – guitar
 Buddy Charleton – pedal steel guitar
 Gary Shook – guitar, bass
 Jack Drake – bass
 Jack Greene – drums
 Hargus "Pig" Robbins – piano
 Jerry Smith – piano

Chart positions

References 

Ernest Tubb albums
1965 albums
Albums produced by Owen Bradley
Decca Records albums